JAR-OPS 1 is the Joint Aviation Requirement for the operation of commercial air transport (aeroplanes).  Any commercial airline within the European Union flying jet or propeller aircraft has to comply with this standard.  Compliance is governed through the issuance of an Air Operator Certificate (AOC) and an Operator's Licence (OL).  

An important provision of this standard is that the airline has to write and maintain an Operations Manual with a structure that mirrors the structure of the standard. 

JAR OPS has been replaced with EU OPS.

The regulations concern Training, Documentation, Procedures and Compliances in the following categories

 Operator certification and supervision
 Operational procedures
 All weather operations
 Performance general
 Performance class l
 Performance class k
 Performance class h
 Mass and balance
 Instruments and equipment
 Communication and navigation equipment
 Aeroplane maintenance
 Flight crew
 Cabin crew
 Manuals, logs and records
 Flight and duty time limitations and rest requirements
 Transport of dangerous goods by air
 Security

References

External links 
 List of other JAR documents

Aviation licenses and certifications
Aviation safety